Burhan Uddin Khan is a Bangladesh Awami League politician and a former Jatiya Sangsad member representing the Dhaka-2 constituency.

Career
Khan was elected to parliament from Dhaka-2 as a Bangladesh Awami League candidate in 1986 and 1988.

References

Living people
Awami League politicians
3rd Jatiya Sangsad members
4th Jatiya Sangsad members
Year of birth missing (living people)
Place of birth missing (living people)